Thulsa Doom may refer to:
 Thulsa Doom, a character created by Robert E. Howard, and since used in items based on his Conan and Kull stories
 Thulsa Doom (band), a Norwegian stoner rock band
 Thulsa Doom (album), an album by Reverend Bizarre